Udaysingh Rajput  is a Shiv Sena politician from Aurangabad district, Maharashtra. He is current Member of Legislative Assembly from Kannad Vidhan Sabha constituency as a member of Shiv Sena, as well as a social worker and was elected as member of legislative assembly in year 2019.

Positions held
 2019: Elected to Maharashtra Legislative Assembly

References

External links
  Shivsena Home Page 

Maharashtra MLAs 2019–2024
Shiv Sena politicians
1971 births
Living people
People from Aurangabad district, Maharashtra
Marathi politicians
Nationalist Congress Party politicians